Mega TV is a Tamil Language satellite television channel based in Chennai, India. It is the flagship channel of the Mega TV Network, launched on 19 November 2007. It is founded by Former Union minister of India K. V. Thangkabalu. The channel features a variety of infotainment shows, music programs, newscasts and classic films.

History
Mega TV was launched by All India Congress Committee President Sonia Gandhi in New Delhi on 19 November 2007.

List of films
Neeyum Naanum (2010)
Virunthali (2010)
Sattam Oru Iruttarai (2012)
Touring Talkies (2015)
Thunai Mudhalvar (2015)

References
 http://megatv.in
 http://www.thehindu.com/news/national/tamil-nadu/article394675.ece
 

Tamil-language television channels
Television channels and stations established in 2007
Television stations in Chennai